Pharaoh is the title of ancient Egyptian monarchs.

Pharaoh, Pharao or Pharoah may also refer to:

Arts and entertainment

Film and literature
 Pharaoh (Prus novel), a book by Bolesław Prus
 Pharaoh (film), a 1966 Polish film adaptation 
 Pharaoh (Smith novel), a 2016 novel by Wilbur Smith
 "Pharaoh" (Old English poem), a fragmentary poem from the Exeter Book

Gaming
 Pharaoh (card game), or Faro, a 17th-century French gambling card game
 Pharaoh (module), an accessory for Dungeons & Dragons
 Pharaoh (video game), a 1999 city-building video game
 Pharaoh: A New Era , an upcoming remaster of the 1999 video game

Music
 Pharaoh (band), an American power metal band
 The Pharaohs, an American soul/jazz/funk band 1962–1973
 The Pharaohs, a 1960s American pop music group fronted by Sam the Sham
 Pharao, German Eurodance act
 Pharoah (album), by Pharoah Sanders, 1976
 "Pharaohs", a 1985 song by Tears for Fears, B-side of "Everybody Wants to Rule the World"
 "Pharaoh", a song by Symphony X from their 1997 album The Divine Wings of Tragedy

Other uses in arts and entertainment
 The Pharaohs, a fictional street gang in the 1973 film American Graffiti

People
 Ashley Pharoah (born 1959), a British screenwriter and television producer
 Jay Pharoah (born 1987), an American actor and comedian
 Pharoah Sanders (1940–2022), an American jazz saxophonist
 Pharoh Cooper (born 1995), an American football player

Other uses
 Pharoah, Oklahoma, a place in the U.S.
 Pharaoh ant, an insect
 Pharaoh Hound, a Maltese breed of dog
 Pharaoh (Book of Abraham), in Mormonism, a proper name of the first king of Egypt
 The Pharaohs, a nickname of the Egypt national football team
 Danish ship Færøe, erroneously translated as 'Pharaoh'
 "Pharaoh", a disc golf distance driver by Infinite Discs

See also

 American Pharaoh (disambiguation)
 Faro (disambiguation)
 Faroe Islands 
 Fårö, an island
 Pharoahe Monch (born 1972), American hip hop artist
 Pharaon, a ship in Dumas' novel The Count of Monte Cristo